Chotowa  is a village in the administrative district of Gmina Czarna, within Dębica County, Subcarpathian Voivodeship, in south-eastern Poland.

The village has a population of 618.

The 2010 World Junior Chess Championship took place in Chotowa.

References

Chotowa